Tugimaantee 22 (ofcl. abbr. T22), also called the Rakvere–Väike-Maarja–Vägeva highway, is a 52-kilometre-long national basic road in northwestern Estonia. The highway begins at central Rakvere on national road 5 and ends at Koluvere on national road 39.

See also
 Transport in Estonia

References

External links

N22